Demasiado tarde is the eleventh studio album by the Argentine singer Pablo Ruiz. It was released in 2005, coinciding with the celebration of the 20th anniversary of his career.

Track list 

 Alguien Como Tú
 Prefiero Perderte
 Demasiado Tarde
 Qué Te Ha Dado Él
 Quisiera
 Tras De Mí
 Hoy
 Ayúdame
 Te Quiero, Te Quiero
 Baila Conmigo
 Demasiado Tarde (Banda version) (Bonus track)
 Alguien Como Tú (Banda version) (Bonus track)
 Demasiado Tarde (Salsa version) (Bonus track)

References 

Pablo Ruiz (singer) albums
2005 albums